Al-Ashrafiyah (also spelled Ashrafiyah, Ashrafiyye, Ashrafiyeh, Ashrafiyya, or Achrafieh) is an Arabic word that could refer to the following places:

Jordan
 , a neighborhood in Amman and the highest point in the city
 , a neighborhood in Irbid
 , a neighborhood in Mafraq

Lebanon
Achrafieh, a district of Beirut

Palestine
Al-Ashrafiyya, a depopulated Palestinian village in Galilee near Baysan

Syria
Ashrafiyah, Hama, a village in al-Suqaylabiyah district near Hama
Ashrafiyah, Homs, a village near Homs
Ashrafiyat Sahnaya, a village in the Darayya district near Damascus
Ashrafiyat al-Wadi, a village in the Qudsaya district near Damascus
Khanazir, also known as Ashrafiya, a village in Masyaf district near Hama

See also 
 Ashrafiyya (disambiguation)